The Third Gulf Breeze, (8SR8), is a Santa Rosa-Swift Creek culture archaeological site near Gulf Breeze, Florida. On September 28, 1998, it was added to the U.S. National Register of Historic Places.

References

External links
 Santa Rosa County listings at National Register of Historic Places

Swift Creek culture
Archaeological sites in Florida
National Register of Historic Places in Santa Rosa County, Florida